Ran Alterman (born April 27, 1980) is an Israeli triathlete active in 2001–2011. His identical twin brother, Dan Alterman, is also a triathlete.

Career highlights
 Israeli Champion 2002
 Israeli Champion 2006
 Israeli Champion 2007
 Israeli Champion 2008
 Israeli Champion 2009
 Gold in the Philippines World Cup race

References
Profile

1980 births
Living people
20th-century Israeli Jews
21st-century Israeli Jews
Israeli male triathletes
Identical twins
Israeli twins
Twin sportspeople
Jewish Israeli sportspeople